Beeston was a parliamentary constituency in Nottinghamshire which returned one Member of Parliament (MP) to the House of Commons of the Parliament of the United Kingdom.

It was created for the February 1974 general election from part of the Rushcliffe constituency, and abolished for the 1983 general election.

Boundaries 
The Urban Districts of Beeston and Stapleford, and Eastwood, and in the Rural District of Basford the parishes of Awsworth, Brinsley, Cossall, Greasley, Kimberley, Nuthall, Strelley, and Trowell.

Members of Parliament

Elections

References 

Parliamentary constituencies in Nottinghamshire (historic)
Constituencies of the Parliament of the United Kingdom established in 1974
Constituencies of the Parliament of the United Kingdom disestablished in 1983